Kunigunde of Eisenberg (also known as Kunne;  – before 31 May 1286), was a German noblewoman and the second wife of Landgrave Albert II of Thuringia.

She was a daughter of Count Otto of Eisenberg and his wife Anna of Kottwotz.

Life 
Kunigunde was a lady-in-waiting of Albert's first wife, Margaret of Sicily. Beautiful and ambitious, she attracted the attention of the Landgrave and became his mistress, bearing him two illegitimate children: 
Elisabeth (1269 – ), married before 11 April 1291 to Henry II of Frankenstein (d. 23 April 1326).
Albert, nicknamed Apitz, (1270 – between 1301 and 1305), Lord of Tenneberg from 1290, buried in the St. Catherine monastery in Eisenach.

With her lover's knowledge, is said that Kunigunde attempted the murder of Landgravine Margaret so that she could usurp her position and honours. After some poison attempts, Kunigunde finally managed to so frighten her mistress, that Margaret fled the court the night of 24 June 1270, fearing for her life. According to legend, she bit her son Frederick I in the cheek before she left; this explains his nickname "Frederick the Bitten". She died six weeks later in Frankfurt am Main.

Kunigunde's marriage with Albert took place soon afterwards (1272), despite the fact that she was of lower rank. During the ceremony, she concealed her son Apitz under her robe, as this was supposed to procure for natural children, the privileges of legitimacy. However this marriage brought baneful consequences for Thuringia. Estranged from his legitimate sons, the Landgrave disinherited them and proclaimed Kunigunde's son to be his heir. The Thuringian nobility resisted this, which led to a long succession of military hostilities between father and sons. The affair was only able to be settled peaceably when Kunigunde died (before 31 May 1286), aged about forty. She was buried in the St. Catherine monastery in Eisenach.

Was only after her death that Albert divided his territories amongst his legitimate sons.

References 
W. K. v. Isenburg: Europäische Stammtafeln, vol. I, table 45, Marburg, 1953, reprinted: 1965
O. Posse: Die Wettiner, Leipzig, 1897, reprinted: 1994
D. Schwennicke: Europäische Stammtafeln, vol. 11, table 152, Marburg, 1998
Cronica Reinhardsbrunnensis 1283, MGH SS XXX.1, p. 635.
Eisenberg, Cunigunde von – (c1245 – 1286) in: abitofhistory.net [retrieved 18 November 2014].

External links 
 
 
 
 http://wwperson.informatik.uni-erlangen.de/cgi-bin/l3/LANG=germ/F=Cunigunde/N=v.Eisenberg

13th-century births
1286 deaths
German countesses
13th-century German nobility
13th-century German women